Qarah Quch or Qareh Quch may refer to:
 Qarah Quch, Ardabil
 Qareh Quch, East Azerbaijan
 Qareh Quch-e Min Bashi, East Azerbaijan Province